UFC 288: Sterling vs. Cejudo is an upcoming mixed martial arts event produced by the Ultimate Fighting Championship that will take place on May 6, 2023, at the Prudential Center in Newark, New Jersey.

Background
The event will mark the promotion's ninth visit to Newark and first since UFC on ESPN: Covington vs. Lawler in August 2019.

A UFC Bantamweight Championship bout between current champion Aljamain Sterling and former UFC Flyweight and Bantamweight Champion Henry Cejudo (also 2008 Olympic gold medalist in freestyle wrestling) is expected to headline the event.

Fight card

Announced bouts 

Women's Strawweight bout: Jéssica Andrade vs. Yan Xiaonan
Lightweight bout: Drew Dober vs. Matt Frevola

See also 

 List of UFC events
 List of current UFC fighters
 2023 in UFC

References 

 

Ultimate Fighting Championship events
2023 in mixed martial arts
Scheduled mixed martial arts events
2023 in sports in New Jersey
May 2023 sports events in the United States